Cashel King Cormacs GAA is a Gaelic Athletic Association club located in the town of Cashel, County Tipperary in Ireland.  They play their games in Leahy Park, on the Clonmel Road in Cashel. The club is named for the king-bishop Cormac Mac Cárthaigh (d. 1138).

Extensive work has been carried out in the last few years, with the addition of a new clubhouse and main stand the highlight.
Notable games have been held here in the last few years and it has become the annual venue for both the County Senior Club Football Final and the Munster Colleges Senior Hurling Dr.Harty Cup Final.

Camogie
Cashel Camogie club won the All-Ireland Senior Club Camogie Championship in 2007 and 2009. They won further Munster senior club championships in 2001, 2002, 2005 and 2006. 
The sport was revived in 1971 after a team emerged from the Presentation Convent by Willie Prendergast, Sr Mary Brennan and Sr Maureen McGrath. The school enjoyed successful years, winning Munster and All-Ireland colleges’ titles with Julia O’Dwyer, Anne Moloney and Geraldine Ryan and TJ Connolly organised or coached successful sides.

Honours

Hurling
 Munster Senior Club Hurling Championship: 1
 1991
 Tipperary Senior Hurling Championship: 1
1991
 West Tipperary Senior Hurling Championship: 18
1934, 1936, 1937, 1939, 1940, 1945, 1948, 1965, 1971, 1975, 1976, 1980, 1988, 1990, 1991, 1993, 1994, 1995
 West Tipperary Intermediate Hurling Championship: (1)
 2015
 Tipperary Junior A Hurling Championship: (1)
 1991
 West Tipperary Junior A Hurling Championship: (5)
 1933, 1953, 1984, 1986, 1991, 1994
 West Tipperary Junior B Hurling Championship: (5)
 1993, 1995, 2003, 2008, 2016
 Tipperary Under-21 Hurling Championship: (1)
 1991
 West Tipperary Under-21 A Hurling Championship: (7)
 1961, 1964, 1976, 1983, 1990, 1991, 1992
 West Tipperary Under-21 B Hurling Championship: (3)
 2010, 2011, 2016
 Tipperary Minor A Hurling Championship: (5)
 1974, 1975, 1980, 1988, 1989
 West Minor A Hurling Championship: (21)
 1931, 1940, 1949, 1952, 1956, 1959, 1960, 1961, 1964, 1972, 1973, 1974, 1975, 1976, 1980, 1987, 1988, 1989, 1992, 2000, 2012
 Tipperary Minor B Hurling Championship: (1)
 2016
 West Tipperary Minor B Hurling Championship: (1)
 2016

Football
 West Tipperary Senior Football Championship: 1
1992
 Tipperary Under-21 Football Championship: (1)
1990
 West Tipperary Under-21 Football Championship: (3)
 1977, 1980, 1990
 West Tipperary Under-21 B Football Championship: (1)
 2012
 Tipperary Intermediate Football Championship: 1
 1976
 West Tipperary Intermediate Football Championship: (3)
 1976, 2006, 2012
 Tipperary Junior Football Championship: (2)
 1976, 1984
 West Tipperary Junior Football Championship: (2)
 1982, 1984
 Mid Tipperary Junior Football Championship (2)
 1924, 1925
 Tipperary Junior Football B Championship:
 2017
 West Tipperary Junior B Football Championship: (2)
 2012, 2017
 Tipperary Minor A Football Championship: (1)
 1974
 West Tipperary Minor A Football Championship: (6)
 1965, 1973, 1974, 1976, 1989, 2000
 Tipperary Minor B Football Championship: (1)
 2016
 West Tipperary Minor B Football Championship: (2)
 2008, 2016

Notable players
Colm Bonnar
Conal Bonnar
Cormac Bonnar
Dylan Fitzell
Pat Fitzelle
Ryan O'Dwyer
Eoghan Connolly

References

External links
Tipperary GAA site
Official Cashel King Cormacs GAA Club website

Gaelic games clubs in County Tipperary
Hurling clubs in County Tipperary
Gaelic football clubs in County Tipperary
Cashel, County Tipperary